Silecroft is a railway station on the Cumbrian Coast Line, which runs between  and . It is owned by Network Rail and managed by Northern Trains.

The station is located to the west of the  Black Combe Fell. It was opened, along with the line, on 1 November 1850 by the Whitehaven and Furness Junction Railway.

The railway station is a request stop, and one of the many level crossings on this section of the route is controlled from the signal box at its south end.

Some through trains to the Furness Line towards  stop here.

Facilities
The station is unstaffed, but like many others on this route had a ticket vending machine installed in 2019 to allow passengers to buy tickets before boarding.  There are shelters, digital information screens and timetable posters on each platform, along with a telephone for obtaining train running details.  Level access is available to both platforms, but these are lower than standard and need portable steps for entry or exit from the train (so the station is not suitable for wheelchair users).

Services

Monday to Saturdays there is generally an hourly request service southbound to Barrow and northbound towards Whitehaven and Carlisle, although there are one or two longer gaps at certain times of day.

A Sunday service was introduced at the May 2018 timetable change, along with additional evening trains on weekdays.  The Sunday service is the first to be provided here for more than 40 years.

References

External links

 
 

Railway stations in Cumbria
DfT Category F2 stations
Former Furness Railway stations
Railway stations in Great Britain opened in 1850
Northern franchise railway stations
Railway request stops in Great Britain
Whicham